The Canadian Efficiency Decoration (ED) was a Canadian military award given to officers of the Non-Permanent Active Militia, RCAF Auxiliary and Reserve who completed twenty years of meritorious military service. Similar  Efficiency Decorations were also awarded by other Commonwealth countries. A bar was issued for an additional 20 years of meritorious service. Approximately 3,700 medals were issued.

Time spent in war service counted double towards the 20 year requirement and time spent in the ranks counted as half.  The award was superseded by the Air Efficiency Award for members of the RCAF Auxiliary and Reserve in 1942.  Eligible members who entered the Canadian Forces before 1 September 1939 continued to be eligible for award of the Canadian Efficiency Decoration and bars to the decoration.  Members who had joined after that time were eligible for the Canadian Forces Decoration, which superseded the Canadian Efficiency Decoration, on its establishment in 1949.

References 

Military awards and decorations of Canada